Frank H. Stedman House is a historic home located at Fayetteville, Cumberland County, North Carolina. It was built in 1925, and consists of a two-story, five bay, main block with a hip roof and projecting one-story, flat-roofed wings that form a "U"-shape.  It is sheathed in stucco and is in the Italian Renaissance style.  The front facade features an arcade supported by two Corinthian order columns.  Also on the property is a contributing garage apartment.

It was listed on the National Register of Historic Places in 2002.

References

Houses on the National Register of Historic Places in North Carolina
Italianate architecture in North Carolina
Houses completed in 1925
Houses in Fayetteville, North Carolina
National Register of Historic Places in Cumberland County, North Carolina